Katsurada is a Japanese surname. Notable people with this name include:
Fujiro Katsurada (1867–1946), Japanese parasitologist
Katsurada Nagatoshi (1541–1574), feudal Japanese retainer
Yoshie Katsurada (1911–1980), Japanese mathematician

Japanese-language surnames